Françoise Fong-Wa Yip (葉芳華; born September 4, 1972) is a Canadian actress. She first became known for her performances in Hong Kong films, before later also starring in North American films and television shows. She is best known to international audiences for her roles in action films opposite Jackie Chan and Jet Li.

Early life and education
Yip was born in North Vancouver, British Columbia, Canada, and was raised in Toronto, Ontario. Her father is a Canadian of Chinese descent and her mother is French-Canadian.

Career
Yip is known for her roles in Stanley Tong's Rumble in the Bronx and Daniel Lee's Black Mask. She did two movies with Jet Li, the first in a starring role in Black Mask and the second in Romeo Must Die, where she played a Chinese gangster motorcycle assassin. She also starred in the Doris Yeung film Motherland and appeared in the American action horror films Aliens vs. Predator: Requiem and Blade: Trinity.

Yip appeared in the television series Andromeda as two different characters, and guest-starred in the Canadian TV show Blood Ties.

Filmography

Film

Television

References

External links

1972 births
Living people
Actresses from British Columbia
Canadian actresses of Chinese descent
Canadian film actresses
Canadian television actresses
Canadian people of French descent
Franco-Columbian people
People from North Vancouver
20th-century Canadian actresses
21st-century Canadian actresses
Canadian-born Hong Kong artists